Salina Township is one of seventeen townships in Kankakee County, Illinois, USA.  As of the 2010 census, its population was 1,396 and it contained 537 housing units.  It was formed from part of Limestone Township on April 7, 1854.

Geography

Cities, towns, villages
 Bonfield

Unincorporated towns
 Frielings at 
(This list is based on USGS data and may include former settlements.)

Adjacent townships
 Rockville Township (northeast)
 Limestone Township (east)
 Pilot Township (south)
 Essex Township (west)
 Custer Township, Will County (northwest)

Cemeteries
The township contains these three cemeteries: Beach, Bonfield and Maple Grove.

Major highways
  Illinois Route 17

Airports and landing strips
 Hawker Airport

Landmarks
 Kankakee River State Park

Demographics

Government
The township is governed by an elected Town Board of a Supervisor and four Trustees.  The Township also has an elected Assessor, Clerk, Highway Commissioner and Supervisor.  The Township Office is located at 3388 North 10000 West Road, Bonfield, IL 60913.

Political districts
 Illinois's 11th congressional district
 State House District 75
 State Senate District 38

School districts
 Herscher Community Unit School District 2

References
 
 United States Census Bureau 2007 TIGER/Line Shapefiles
 United States National Atlas

External links
 Kankankee County Official Site
 City-Data.com
 Illinois State Archives

Townships in Kankakee County, Illinois
1854 establishments in Illinois
Townships in Illinois